Ben LaBolt (born August 20, 1981) is an American political advisor who is the White House Communications Director. He succeeded Kate Bedingfield in the role when she stepped down at the end of February 2023. Previously, LaBolt has worked on presidential campaigns for Barack Obama and Howard Dean, as well as for Jan Schakowsky, Sherrod Brown, and Rahm Emanuel.

Early life
LaBolt was born August 20, 1981. He is from La Grange, Illinois. He graduated from Lyons Township High School and Middlebury College, earning a bachelor's degree in political science in 2003. At Middlebury, he was president of the College Democrats and volunteered on Howard Dean's 2000 reelection campaign as governor of Vermont.

Career
LaBolt's first job out of college was for Dean's 2004 presidential campaign. He worked as the press secretary for U.S. Representative Jan Schakowsky, for Sherrod Brown's 2006 Senate campaign, for Barack Obama's Senate office, and for his 2008 presidential campaign. He then served as a deputy White House Press Secretary during the presidency of Barack Obama. In the White House, he worked on communications during the Sonia Sotomayor and Elena Kagan Supreme Court nominations.

In October 2010, LaBolt became communications director for Rahm Emanuel during the 2011 Chicago mayoral election. After the campaign, he served as the national press secretary for Obama's 2012 presidential campaign.

In June 2013, LaBolt and Robert Gibbs co-founded a strategic communications practice called The Incite Agency, which later merged with Bully Pulpit Interactive (BPI). LaBolt became a partner at BPI.

LaBolt worked on the presidential transition of Joe Biden following the 2020 United States presidential election and as head of communications for the Ketanji Brown Jackson Supreme Court nomination in 2022. He succeeded Kate Bedingfield as White House Communications Director on March 1, 2023.

Personal life
LaBolt is openly gay, and is the first openly gay White House Communications Director.

References

American press secretaries
Biden administration personnel
Gay politicians
LGBT appointed officials in the United States
LGBT people from Illinois
Living people
Middlebury College alumni
Obama administration personnel
People from La Grange, Illinois
White House Communications Directors
Year of birth missing (living people)
21st-century American LGBT people